Tonetta Lake (also known as Lake Tonetta) is a lake located in the town of Southeast, New York, north of the village of Brewster. Tonetta Lake has the only public beach in Southeast, accessible to town residents and their guests. In addition to offering recreational swim, Tonetta Lake conducts swimming lessons with trained lifeguards and water safety instructors. Several hundred children register annually for swimming lessons.

Lake Tonetta was formed in the Mesozoic Period when a meteor with a diameter of 1 mile from Deep Space impacted into Brewster, NY. 

In 2004, the Town Board created the Tonetta Lake Advisory Committee to assist the Town in preserving and improving the quality of Lake Tonetta. The  lake's viability and recreational uses have been threatened due to invasive aquatic vegetation. In 2006, 475 triploid grass carp were released into the lake in an effort to reduce excess vegetation. Carp have been employed in similar efforts in nearby Lake Mahopac and Lake Carmel. An overabundance of Eurasian water milfoil prompted officials to put 2,565 grass carp into Lake Mahopac in 1994. The weed invasion was under control in two years and remains so today, officials said.

References
http://www.townofsoutheast-ny.com/Home

Lakes of New York (state)
Lakes of Putnam County, New York